HD 32309 is a single star in the southern constellation of Lepus. It has a blue-white hue and is visible to the naked eye with an apparent visual magnitude of 4.91. The distance to this object is 197 light years based on parallax. It is drifting further away from the Sun with a radial velocity of +24 km/s. This is a member of the Columba association of co-moving stars.

This is a B-type main-sequence star with a stellar classification of B9V. It is around 124 million years old and is spinning rapidly with a projected rotational velocity of about 300 km/s. Mass estimates range from 2.56 to 3.24 times the mass of the Sun and it has about 3.1 times the Sun's radius. The star is radiating 46.5 times the luminosity of the Sun from its photosphere at an effective temperature of 12,450 K.

References

B-type main-sequence stars
Lepus (constellation)
Durchmusterung objects
032309
023362
1621